Hanwell is a suburb of London, England.

Hanwell may also refer to:

 Hanwell, New Brunswick, Canada
 Hanwell, Oxfordshire, England